Hammad Azam (Punjabi:حماد اعظم}}; born 16 March 1991 in Fateh Jang) is a Pakistani cricketer, who plays as an all-rounder. He is a right-handed batman and a right-arm medium fast bowler.

Domestic and franchise career
In April 2018, he was named in Khyber Pakhtunkhwa's squad for the 2018 Pakistan Cup. In March 2019, he was named in Sindh's squad for the 2019 Pakistan Cup. He was named the best all-rounder of the tournament, after scoring 144 runs and taking nine wickets.

In September 2019, he was named in Northern's squad for the 2019–20 Quaid-e-Azam Trophy tournament. In January 2021, he was named in Northern's squad for the 2020–21 Pakistan Cup. Following the conclusion of the competition, he was named the player of the tournament.

In April 2021, he was one of four Pakistani cricketers to travel to the United States to take part in the Houston Open T20 Cricket League. In June 2021, he was selected as a member of the Golden State Grizzlies in the Minor League Cricket tournament in the United States following the players' draft.

International career
An all-rounder, Azam made his first-class debut in 2008 for Rawalpindi. He had played just six first-class games before being selected in the Pakistan squad for the U-19 World Cup in New Zealand.

His performance in the tournament was impressive, scoring 173 runs in six matches and getting dismissed only once. His unbeaten 92 against West Indies in the semi-final guided Pakistan to the final of the tournament. He was immediately selected in the Pakistan squad for the Twenty20 International against Australia.

One Day Internationals
On 23 April 2011, Azam along with Mohammad Salman and Junaid Khan made their one-day international debuts against West Indies in St. Lucia. On 25 April 2011, Azam took his first wicket, of Marlon Samuels, in the second Digicel ODI against West Indies in St.Lucia.

Twenty20 International
On 23 February 2012, Azam made his T20I debut against England at Dubai. He did not get to bat or bowl in the game, however, in the next game, he scored 21 off 15 balls including three 4s and one 6 before being caught off Ravi Bopara's bowling. He has played 5 matches till date.

See also
Pakistan U-19 cricket team

References

External links
 
 Official Twitter

1991 births
Living people
Punjabi people
Pakistani cricketers
Pakistan One Day International cricketers
Pakistan Twenty20 International cricketers
Rawalpindi cricketers
Cricketers from Attock
Federal Areas cricketers
Rawalpindi Rams cricketers
National Bank of Pakistan cricketers
Khulna Tigers cricketers
Uva Next cricketers
Sylhet Strikers cricketers
Lahore Qalandars cricketers
Peshawar Zalmi cricketers
Multan Sultans cricketers
Punjab (Pakistan) cricketers